Vox Humana is the fifth studio album released by American singer-songwriter Kenny Loggins. Released in 1985, it was Loggins' first album released after his appearance upon the soundtrack to the motion picture Footloose during the year prior.

Vox Humana was certified Gold in the US by the RIAA.

Overview
Among those who make guest appearances are members of DeBarge, the Pointer Sisters, Philip Bailey, Mr. Mister's Richard Page and Steve George.

Don Shewey reviewed the album for Rolling Stone, favorably comparing its rhythm tracks and production to Quincy Jones, but criticizing "the overblown productions of the Chicago–Journey–Toto school of bombastic pop kitsch", especially on the song "Forever" with music by David Foster. "Forever" was written for a short film called Access All Areas produced by Jenny Sullivan (ex-wife of Jim Messina, Loggins' former bandmate).  The song was a Top 40 hit in 1985, and continues to be a favorite among Loggins' fans. Some of its success on the charts can be attributed to its use in the soap opera, The Young and the Restless.  A live version was recorded on the video for Outside: From the Redwoods but was not included in the album release.

"Love Will Follow" was included as a duet version with singer Shanice on the Kenny Loggins live-concert album  "Outside: From the Redwoods."

Track listing

Personnel 
 Kenny Loggins – lead vocals, acoustic guitar (1), guitar solo (1), keyboards (7)
 Steve Wood – synthesizers (1), keyboards (3, 5, 6, 7), synthesizer programming (3)
 Michael Omartian – keyboards (2), synthesizers (2)
 Randy Kerber – keyboards (3, 5, 7)
 David Foster – keyboards (4, 6, 8), synthesizers (4)
 Michael Boddicker – synthesizers (4, 5)
 Erich Bulling – Yamaha DX1 programming (4)
 Greg Phillinganes – keyboards (7), synthesizers (9)
 Bo Tomlyn – programming (7)
 Randy Waldman – synthesizers (7)
 Steve Porcaro – synthesizer programming (8)
 John Barnes – Yamaha DX7 (9), Fairlight CMI (9)
 Derek Nakamoto – programming (9)
 Michael Landau – guitar (2, 3, 4, 8, 9)
 Tim Pierce – guitar solo (2)
 Paul Jackson, Jr. – guitar (5)
 Buzz Feiten – guitar (6)
 Steve Lukather – guitar solo (6)
 David Williams – guitar (9)
 Nathan East – bass (1, 3, 5, 6, 7, 9)
 Abraham Laboriel – bass (8)
 Tris Imboden – drums (3, 6, 8)
 John Robinson – drums (4)
 Paulinho da Costa – percussion (4, 5)
 Sheila E – cabasa (5)
 David Sanborn – saxophone (9)
 Neil Larsen – backing vocals (3), synthesizers (5), keyboards (7)
 Steve George – backing vocals (3)
 Marilyn Martin – backing vocals (3, 9)
 Donna McDaniel – backing vocals (3, 9)
 Richard Page – backing vocals (3)
 Hamish Stuart – backing vocals (3)
 Guy Thomas – backing vocals (3)
 Bunny DeBarge – backing vocals (4)
 El Debarge – backing vocals (4)
 The Pointer Sisters – backing vocals (5)
 Carl Anderson – backing vocals (7)
 Philip Bailey – backing vocals (7)
 Carl Caldwell – backing vocals (7)

Production 
 Producers – Kenny Loggins (Tracks 1, 3, 4, 5, 7, 8 & 9); Michael Omartian (Track 2); David Foster (Track 6).
 Production Coordinators – Arlene Matza and David Warren Bowers
 Engineers – Bobby Cohen, Terry Christian, Mark Ettel, Humberto Gatica, John Guess, Mark Lynette, Terry Nelson, Jack Joseph Puig, Ed Rak and Elliot Scheiner.
 Second Engineers – David Warren Bowers, Steve Crimmel, Larry Ferguson, Cliff Jones, Laura Livingston and Stephen Shelton.
 Recorded at Sunset Sound and The Sound Factory (Hollywood); Larrabee Sound Studios, Devonshire Sound Studios, The Lighthouse, Amigo Studios and Bill Schnee Studios (North Hollywood); Record Plant, Lion Share Recording Studio, The Village Recorder, Ocean Way Recording (Los Angeles); Santa Barbara Sound Design (Santa Barbara); The Blue Tube (Carpinteria); The Hit Factory, Clinton Recording Studio and The Power Station (New York City).
 Mixing – Terry Nelson (Tracks 1 & 7); John Guess (Track 2); Humberto Gatica (Tracks 3, 4, 6, 8 & 9); John "Jellybean" Benitez and Michael Hutchinson (Track 5).
 Mix Assistants – David Warren Bowers and Stephen Shelton (Tracks 3, 4, 6, 8 & 9); Sabrina Buchanek (Track 5).
 Mixed at Sunset Sound, Lion Share Recording Studio and Larabee Sound Studios.
 Mix Technicians – Murray Kunis and Paul Tye
 Mastered by George Marino at Sterling Sound (New York City).
 Art Direction – Tony Lane and Nancy Donald
 Cover Artwork – Michael Gonzales
 Back Cover Photo – Greg Gorman 
 Inner Sleeve Photos – Lester Cohen, Sam Emerson, Harrison Funk and Daryl Weisser.

References 

1985 albums
Kenny Loggins albums
Albums produced by David Foster
Albums produced by Michael Omartian
Columbia Records albums